Beaurepaire is a commune  in the Seine-Maritime department in the Normandy region in northern France.

Geography

Population

Places of interest
 The church of St. Thomas, dating from the eighteenth century.
 Traces of a medieval castle.

See also
Communes of the Seine-Maritime department

References

Communes of Seine-Maritime